Dániel Magay (born April 6, 1932 in Szeged, Hungary) is an Olympic and World Championship Gold Medal saber fencer.

Early training
After completing his high school studies at the Piarista Gimnazium, Magay studied with the Italian fencing master Eduardo Armentano, who had come to Hungary as part of the national effort to learn from fencing masters from other countries with the best fencing programs, dating back to Luigi Barbasetti and Italo Santelli.

Once he had learned the basics, he studied with the renowned fencing master Ferenc Marki in Szeged in order to discipline, refine, and raise his saber technique to the highest level.

Fencing success in Hungary
Magay’s great fencing talent, sharpened by Maestro Marki’s knowledge and guidance, resulted in his rapid rise to the top of local fencing competitions, bringing him to the notice of those who chose the best fencers in the land to represent the country. He was repeatedly chosen to be a member of the Hungarian National Saber Team from 1953 to 1956.

In 1953, he introduced himself to world class saber fencing at the International World Championship Competition in Brussels.

By 1954, Magay had won a gold medal for first place saber team at the 1954 World Championship.

In 1955, his skill had elevated to the point that at a major competition he beat Hungary’s best saber champion Rudolf Karpathy 5:0 and Karpathy’s coach Maestro Alfred Gellert congratulated Maestro Ferenc Marki by stating "Now, I can proudly say that I was your fencing master at one time."

The 1956 Melbourne Olympics
As a member of the Hungarian National Olympic Saber Team Fencing at the 1956 Summer Olympics in Melbourne, Australia, Magay won Olympic Gold for his country by taking first place in the Saber Team competition.

During this time, the invasion of Hungary and seizure control by Communist Russia forced many Hungarian Olympians to make the tough decision not to return home. Magay decided to immigrate to the Pacific Coast of the United States with his Hungarian Olympic saber team coach, and prior Olympian, György Piller. (Cohen 2002:402-403).

Fencing in the United States
In 1957, Maestro Piller, Magay, and other Hungarian fencers founded Pannonia Athletic Club in San Francisco for teaching and learning the art of fencing.

The Pannonia Athletic Club Saber Team with Magay took first place in the Pacific Coast Sectional Competitions in 1957 and 1959.

In 1957, 1958, and 1961, Magay won the gold medal for Individual Saber in the United States Individual Championships.

In 1958, György Piller became the fencing master of the University of California at Berkeley, and Dániel Magay joined the intercollegiate fencing team while continuing his education in engineering.  This combination of fencing power virtually skyrocketed Cal Berkeley to the top of local intercollegiate competition.  The University of California 1959 Cal Blue and Gold Yearbook stated:  “Cal's Fencing Team, coached by famed Hungarian Master George Piller, enjoyed a successful 1958-59 The Bears beat Stanford, San Jose State, SF State, University of Arizona, and the Air Force Academy to emerge as champions of the Western Intercollegiate Fencing Conference. This feat earned them five first-place trophies.” (University of California 1959:262).

After the death of Maestro György Piller in 1960, Magay arranged for his old Maestro Ferenc Marki to come from Brazil and take over the stewardship of the Pannonia Athletic Club. As a result, the Pannonia Athletic Club victories in team saber continued with Magay in 1961, 1962, 1963, 1964, 1965, and 1966.

After this period, Magay put down his saber and pursued his chosen field of the science of chemistry.

References

Notes
*Cohen, Richard (2002). "By the Sword:  A History of Gladiators, Musketeers, Samurai, Swashbucklers, and Olympic Champions."  New York:  The Modern Library. . .
*University of California (1958). "Blue and Gold Yearbook for 1958."  Berkeley:  University of California Press. 

*University of California (1959). "Blue and Gold Yearbook for 1959."  Berkeley:  University of California Press. 

1932 births
Living people
Hungarian male sabre fencers
Olympic fencers of Hungary
Fencers at the 1956 Summer Olympics
Olympic gold medalists for Hungary
Olympic medalists in fencing
Medalists at the 1956 Summer Olympics
Sportspeople from Szeged